I25 may refer to:
 Hyundai i25, a car
 Interstate 25, United States
 , a Japanese Navy submarine

See also
 I-25 & Broadway station, Denver, Colorado, United States